Winterplace Ski Resort is a ski resort located in Ghent, West Virginia on Raleigh County's Flat Top Mountain.  The southernmost ski resort in West Virginia, Winterplace is a popular attraction due to its proximity to Interstate 77.  It operates in conjunction with The Resort at Glade Springs, a four season golf resort and spa.

History
The first ski resort on Flat Top Mountain was established on the north slope of Bald Knob in 1958.  Named Bald Knob Ski Slopes, the resort was the second commercial ski location in West Virginia, following the predecessors of Canaan Valley Ski Resort. It was founded by future West Virginia governor Hulett C. Smith and businessman John McKay, and designed by former Army officer Robert K. Potter.  Operating with four tow ropes and a double chair, the resort's longest trail extended 2,800 feet.  It was marketed as the southernmost ski resort in the Eastern United States.  The resort closed in 1961; the site is now known as Old Winterplace.  The current ski resort, sometimes known as New Winterplace, was established fifteen years later on Huff Knob, southeast of the former resort site; the two resort sites are separated by I-77.

The mountain
Winterplace is nearly equidistant between Beckley, West Virginia to the north on Interstate 77 and Princeton, West Virginia to the south.  The resort's southern location and proximity to the north-south I-77 corridor draws visitors from North and South Carolina as well as local skiers from Virginia and West Virginia.  The Southern West Virginia visitor's bureau promotes the resort as "the most accessible, affordable ski resort in the Southeast". 

It has  of skiable area, 28 trails, a terrain park, and nine lifts. A fifty million gallon reservoir lake enables supplementary snowmaking at a rate of 7,000 gallons of water per minute. The resort's 16-lane snow tubing facility is cited as the largest in West Virginia.

The resort's ski trails extend up the northern slope of Huff Knob, in the curve of I-77.  The terrain in front of the resort complex is devoted to beginner skiing; three chair lifts climb midway up the ridge, providing access to mixed easier and intermediate trails, plus the resort's terrain park and snow tubing facility.  Another set of two parallel chairs extends from the resort's mid-mountain lodge to the summit, accessing expert and intermediate terrain.  A run of 1.25 miles is available by skiing from the mountain summit to the main base, but multiple chairlift rides are required for return; other trails are a fraction of that length.

The Resort at Glade Springs
The Resort at Glade Springs is located eight miles north of Winterplace in Daniels, West Virginia, near the intersection of I-77 and Interstate 64.  It operates a spa and three golf courses  The Cobb Course and the Stonehaven Course have been rated among the top five courses in West Virginia by Golfweek Magazine; the Cobb Course, designed by George Cobb, was rated West Virginia's best golf course in 1995.  Glade Springs is also the home course for the WVU Tech men's and women's golf teams. Glade Springs also offers horseback riding and whitewater rafting on the New River.

References

External links
 Winterplace Ski Resort official site
 The Resort at Glade Springs
 WVExp.com description of Flat Top Mountain
 
 

Ski areas and resorts in West Virginia
Buildings and structures in Raleigh County, West Virginia
Tourist attractions in Raleigh County, West Virginia
1958 establishments in West Virginia
West Virginia Tech Golden Bears